José Luis Riveiro (born 15 September 1975) is a Spanish professional football manager who currently manages one of South Africa's biggest football clubs Orlando Pirates FC in the DStv Premiership.

Career
Born in Vigo, Galicia, Riveiro began his coaching career at early age, and took over his first senior team, CD Teis in the regional leagues shortly after. After three years in charge of the team, he spent two seasons as an assistant and coach of Rápido de Bouzas' youth categories before returning to Teis.

In 2010, Riveiro was appointed manager of Mondariz FC in the Primeira Autonómica (sixth division), achieving promotion to the Preferente in his first campaign. While in charge of the club, he was also a coach of CD Choco and RC Celta de Vigo's youth categories.

Riveiro resigned from Mondariz in May 2014, and moved abroad in July to work at Finnish side FC Honka, as an assistant coach. In April of the following year, he moved to fellow league team PK-35 Vantaa, also as an assistant.

On 7 June 2016, Riveiro was appointed assistant manager of Helsingin Jalkapalloklubi. On 5 October 2018, he was named manager of FC Inter Turku.

In his first season in charge, Riveiro led Inter to the second position in the Veikkausliiga, qualifying the side to a European competition after six years. On 25 September 2020, he renewed his contract for the 2021 campaign. For the 2022 season, Inter replaced him with Miguel Grau.

On 25 June 2022 he was announced as the head coach of the South African suite, Orlando Pirates FC.He then went on to help Orlando Pirates FC win the MTN 8,in his first campaign.

References

External links

1977 births
Living people
Sportspeople from Vigo
Spanish football managers
RC Celta de Vigo non-playing staff
Veikkausliiga managers
FC Inter Turku managers
Premier Soccer League managers
Orlando Pirates F.C. managers
Spanish expatriate football managers
Expatriate football managers in Finland
Spanish expatriate sportspeople in Finland
Expatriate soccer managers in South Africa
Spanish expatriate sportspeople in South Africa